Glenlee is a rural locality in the Livingstone Shire, Queensland, Australia.

Geography 
The locality is bounded by an unnamed creek to the north, Yaamba Road to the east, Ramsay Creek to the south-east, and the Fitzroy River to the south-west and west.

The North Coast railway line enters the locality from the south-east (Parkhurst) and exits to the north-east (Glendale).

History 
The School of Today opened in 1996. Some time prior to 2007, it was renamed Glenlee Christian College. The school was established by parents whose children who suffered from sensitivities to chemicals or who had learning difficulties linked to environmental factors. Therefore the school was established in a rural area away from the pollution of traffic and urban activities.  As of 2007, the school had nine students and one teacher. It was located at 46 Dawson Road just to the east of the North Coast railway line. The school subsequently closed.

In January 2016, Carinity Education Rockhampton established a school on the site of the Glenlee Christian College. 

Education 
Carinity Education Rockhampton is a private secondary (7-11) school for boys and girls at 46 Dawson Road. In 2017, the school had an enrolment of 89 students with 6 teachers and 11 non-teaching staff (9 full-time equivalent). The school caters for students who have disengaged with mainstream education or are risk of doing so.

There are no mainstream schools in Glenlee. The nearest primary school is Parkhurst State School in neighbouring Parkhurst to the south-west. The nearest secondary is Glenmore State High School in Kawana to the south.

References 

Shire of Livingstone
Localities in Queensland